The Marina Sky Towers was a residential complex under construction in the Dubai Marina area, Dubai, United Arab Emirates. The complex would have consisted of two skyscrapers that would have been named Marina Sky Tower 1 and Marina Sky Tower 2. They would have been joined by a nine-story podium. Construction began in 2009, but was cancelled.

The project was scaled down from the original proposal, which called for three super-tall skyscrapers with more than 100 floors of residences.

Buildings of the complex

See also
List of tallest buildings in Dubai

References

Unbuilt buildings and structures in Dubai
Twin towers